The 2016 NCAA Men's Water Polo Championship was the 48th annual NCAA Men's Water Polo Championship to determine the national champion of NCAA men's collegiate water polo. Tournament matches were played at the Spieker Aquatics Complex at the University of California in Berkeley, California from December 3–4, 2016. The five conferences receiving automatic qualification were: the Collegiate Water Polo Association (CWPA), Mountain Pacific Sports Federation (MPSF), Northeast Water Polo Conference (NWPC), Southern California Intercollegiate Athletic Conference (SCIAC) and the Western Water Polo Association (WWPA). California defeated USC 11-8 to win the national title in double overtime.

Qualification
Since there has only ever been one single national championship for water polo, all NCAA men's water polo programs (whether from Division I, Division II, or Division III) were eligible. Under the new format, seven teams are invited to contest this single-elimination tournament. The championship was held December 3 and 4, hosted by California.

Play-in Games
 Nov. 26 – Harvard (25-6) 13, Bucknell (23-5) 12 (OT), at Harvard University
 Dec. 1, 4:30 PM – Harvard (26-6) 16, UC Davis (23-5) 15, at Spieker Aquatics Complex, Berkeley
 Dec. 1, 6:30 PM – California (20-4) 16, Pomona-Pitzer (21-8) 6,  at Spieker Aquatics Complex, Berkeley

Bracket

Notes
 Lazar Andric from California was named MVP.

See also 
 NCAA Men's Water Polo Championship
 NCAA Women's Water Polo Championship

Further reading 

 Gullikson, Joey. (2019). Strong Side, Weak Side: Goal Generating Tactics in NCAA Men's Water Polo. University of the Pacific, Thesis. https://scholarlycommons.pacific.edu/uop_etds/3618

References 

http://www.ncaa.com/interactive-bracket/waterpolo-men/nc

2016 in American sports
2016 in water polo
2016 in sports in California
NCAA Men's Water Polo Championship